"We Must Believe in Magic" is a song written by Allen Reynolds and Bob McDill and originally released by Crystal Gayle on her fourth studio album We Must Believe in Magic (1977).

In 1978, it was covered by Jack Clement on his album All I Want to Do in Life.

In his book on Johnny Cash, who recorded this song on a Jack Clement–produced album in the 1980s, John M. Alexander describes "We Must Believe in Magic" as a "whimsical piece of sound advice to hold on to our ability to always believe in magic and the guiding hand."

Johnny Cash version 

Johhny Cash covered the song on his Jack Clement–produced 1982 album The Adventures of Johnny Cash.

Released as the last of three singles from it, his version reached number 84 on U.S. Billboard country chart for the week of February 26, 1983.

Track listing

Charts

References

External links 
 "We Must Believe in Magic" on the Johnny Cash official website

Crystal Gayle songs
Johnny Cash songs
1977 songs
1983 singles
Songs written by Allen Reynolds
Songs written by Bob McDill
Song recordings produced by Jack Clement
Columbia Records singles